The Tuloriad is a 2009 military science fiction novel by John Ringo and Tom Kratman, as part of the Legacy of the Aldenata series. It is set after the defeat of the Posleen on Earth, and follows the struggle of that race to survive.

Roland Green of Booklist praised the battle descriptions and Publishers Weekly called the book "an intriguing discussion of the power of faith".

References

2009 American novels
Novels by John Ringo
Legacy of the Aldenata
2009 science fiction novels
American science fiction novels
Military science fiction novels